Junction is a village in Gallatin County, Illinois, United States. The population was 129 at the 2010 census.

History

Junction was founded in the 1880s, and was named for its location at the junction of the L&N and B&O railroads.  When a post office was established in 1884, it was named "Cypress Junction."  The name was changed to "Junction City" in 1888, and shortened to "Junction" in 1894.

Junction's location in a relatively flat area leaves it prone to flooding along the Ohio River, which can cause waters in the nearby Saline River to back up.  A major flood in March 1997 displaced several area residents and blocked all but one road leading into the village.

Crenshaw House
The Hickory Hill mansion, almost five miles west of Junction, is the 19th-century home of illegal slave trader and slave breeder John Hart Crenshaw. It was infamously known as the "Old Slave House," as it was used as a criminal front for the kidnapping of free blacks who were illegally sold into the Southern slave trade on the Reverse Underground Railroad, as well as a farm for slave breeding.

Geography
Junction is located at the center of Gallatin County at  (37.722726, -88.237973). The village lies along Illinois Route 13, a few miles west of the Ohio River, and north of the Shawnee National Forest.  The Saline River, a tributary of the Ohio, passes just to the south.

Demographics

As of the census of 2000, there were 139 people, 66 households, and 43 families residing in the village. The racial makeup of the village was 96.40% White, 2.88% Native American and 0.72% Asian. Hispanic or Latino of any race were 2.88% of the population.

There were 66 households, out of which 25.8% had children under the age of 18 living with them, 45.5% were married couples living together, 18.2% had a female householder with no husband present, and 34.8% were non-families. 33.3% of all households were made up of individuals, and 19.7% had someone living alone who was 65 years of age or older. The average household size was 2.11 and the average family size was 2.65.

In the village, the population was spread out, with 18.7% under the age of 18, 9.4% from 18 to 24, 24.5% from 25 to 44, 29.5% from 45 to 64, and 18.0% who were 65 years of age or older. The median age was 44 years. For every 100 females, there were 80.5 males. For every 100 females age 18 and over, there were 73.8 males.

The median income for a household in the village was $33,750, and the median income for a family was $34,219. Males had a median income of $34,167 versus $27,083 for females. The per capita income for the village was $16,256. There were 3.8% of families and 11.1% of the population living below the poverty line, including no under eighteens and 41.4% of those over 64.

Notable people
John Hart Crenshaw, landowner, salt maker, illegal slave trader kidnapper, and illegal slave breeder

References

Further reading
 1887. History of Gallatin, Saline, Hamilton, Franklin and Williamson Counties, Illinois. Chicago: Goodspeed Publishing Co.
 Musgrave, Jon, ed. 2002. Handbook of Old Gallatin County and Southeastern Illinois. Marion, Ill.: IllinoisHistory.com. 464 pages.
 Musgrave, Jon. 2004, Rev. ed. 2005. Slaves, Salt, Sex & Mr. Crenshaw: The Real Story of the Old Slave House and America's Reverse Underground R.R.. Marion, Ill.: IllinoisHistory.com. 608 pages.

External links

1997 flood in Junction
Junction School

Villages in Gallatin County, Illinois
Villages in Illinois
Populated places on the Underground Railroad